The 2022 Penrith Panthers season is the 56th season in the club's history. Coached by Ivan Cleary and co-captained by Nathan Cleary and Isaah Yeo, the Panthers are competing in the National Rugby League's 2022 Telstra Premiership.

Squad

Player transfers
A † denotes that the transfer occurred during the 2022 season.

Fixtures

Pre-season

Regular season

 Round 10 attendance refers to the total attendance on day 2 of magic round

Finals

Ladder

Other teams
In addition to competing in the National Rugby League, the Panthers are also fielding semi-professional teams in the 2022 Jersey Flegg Cup (for players aged under 21) and the New South Wales Rugby League's The Knock-On Effect NSW Cup (NSW Cup). The 2022 season brought success to the Penrith Panthers seeing them become premiers in SG Ball, Jersey Flegg and NSW Cup.

Representative honours

Domestic

International

References 

Penrith Panthers seasons
Penrith Panthers